Judy J. Syjuco is a Filipino politician and was the Representative of the 2nd District of Iloilo in the 14th Congress. She is a member of Lakas CMD. She is the wife of former Iloilo 2nd District representative and Technical Education and Skills Development director-general, Sec. Augusto L. Syjuco Jr

References 

Living people
Members of the House of Representatives of the Philippines from Iloilo
Women members of the House of Representatives of the Philippines
Lakas–CMD (1991) politicians
People from Iloilo
Year of birth missing (living people)